The North Pike School District is a public school district based in Summit, Mississippi (USA).
In addition to Summit, the district also serves rural areas in northern Pike County.

Schools
 North Pike High School
 North Pike Middle School
 North Pike Elementary School
 North Pike Upper Elementary School
 North Pike Career and Technical Center
 North Pike Superintendent’s Office

Demographics

2006-07 school year
There were a total of 2,097 students enrolled in the North Pike School District during the 2006–2007 school year. The gender makeup of the district was 50% female and 50% male. The racial makeup of the district was 31.66% African American, 67.29% White, 0.29% Hispanic, 0.57% Asian, and 0.19% Native American. 42.9% of the district's students were eligible to receive free lunch.

Athletics

Sports at North Pike include  Football (Varsity and jr varsity), Basketball (Jags and Lady Jags), Baseball, Fast Pitch Softball, Bowling, Cross Country, Soccer, Golf, Track and Field, Tennis, Dance, and Cheer for middle school or higher.

Programs

North Pike also offers the NPSD Dropout prevention program that gives students a second chance and more activities to finish their courses to prevent dropping out.
Also, a Jag to Jag program is offered to help younger students.

In 2023, the high school launched its new program called “See Something Say Something”. This program allows students to report anything they see that is wrong anonymously. Examples of things student can report include vaping, fighting, threats against another student or the school, bomb threats, bullying, and sexual harassment.

Previous school years

Accountability statistics

See also
List of school districts in Mississippi

References

9.http://www.npsd.k12.ms.us/UserFiles/Servers/Server_596388/File/Federal%20Programs/Dropout%20Plan%20%202015-2016.pdf

External links
 

Education in Pike County, Mississippi
School districts in Mississippi